Verhoeven is a toponymic surname of Dutch origin. The name is a contraction of van der Hoeven, meaning "from the homestead". In 2007, Verhoeven was the 44th most common name in the Netherlands (15,902 people). People with this surname include:

Abraham Verhoeven (1575–1652), Flemish newspaper publisher 
Arthur Verhoeven (1889–1958), Belgian composer and organist
Aurore Verhoeven (born 1990), French cyclist
Cornelis Verhoeven (1928–2001), Dutch philosopher and writer 
Deb Verhoeven, Australian media academic and film critic
Helen Verhoeven (born 1974), Dutch painter and sculptor
 (born 1966), Dutch motocross racer
Jeroen Verhoeven (born 1980), Dutch football player
John Verhoeven (fl. 1920), Belgian cyclist
John Verhoeven (born 1953), American baseball pitcher
 (born 1985), Dutch sports climber
Julie Verhoeven (born 1969), British illustrator and designer
Kees Verhoeven (born 1976), Dutch politician and geographer
Lis Verhoeven (born 1931), German actress and theatre director, sister of Michael
Michael Verhoeven (born 1938), German film director, brother of Lis
Nico Verhoeven (born 1961), Dutch cyclist
Noah Verhoeven (born 1999), Canadian soccer player
Paul Verhoeven (1901–1975), German actor and filmmaker, father of Lis and Michael Verhoeven
Paul Verhoeven (born 1938), Dutch film director (no relation to German film family)
Paul Verhoeven (born 1983), Australian radio and television personality
, Indonesian model
Peter Verhoeven (born 1959), American basketball player
 (born 1995), Dutch footballer
Rico Verhoeven (born 1989), Dutch kickboxer
Simon Verhoeven (born 1972), German actor, screenwriter and film director, son of Michael
Theodor Verhoeven (1907–1990), Dutch Catholic priest, missionary and amateur archaeologist
 (1738–1809), Flemish poet and playwright 
Yves Verhoeven (born 1961), French actor
Fictional person
Camille Verhœven, protagonist of a detective trilogy

See also
Verhoeven Open, an American three-cushion billiards tournament sponsored by the Belgian Verhoeven Billiard Table company
Verhoeff
van der Hoeven
Verhoeven's giant tree rat named in honor of Theodor Verhoeven

References

Dutch-language surnames